Holwell Mouth is a  biological Site of Special Scientific Interest south-east of Nether Broughton in Leicestershire. It is common land.

This marsh on Jurassic clay is in the valley of the River Smite, which runs through the site. There are also areas of grassland, bracken and woodland, and the diverse habitats support a range of birds and insects.

There is public access to the site.

References

Sites of Special Scientific Interest in Leicestershire